Ting Stadium is a multi-purpose stadium in Holly Springs, North Carolina. It is home to the Holly Springs Salamanders, a collegiate summer baseball team in the Coastal Plain League, and to Wake FC, a collegiate summer soccer team in USL League Two. It is also used for recreational football, baseball, and soccer programs; and for rentals, concerts, festivals and other events. The stadium hosted the Coastal Plain League's 19th Annual All-Star Game in 2017.

Ting Stadium is located in Ting Park, a city athletic complex. Naming rights to the former North Main Athletic Complex were sold in 2017 to Ting Internet.

Beginning in 2019, Wake FC began playing semi-professional games for both their men's USL League Two and Women's Premier Soccer League team at Ting Stadium.

References

External links
 Ting Stadium – official site
 Ting Park – official site
 Holly Springs Salamanders – official site
 Wake FC - official site
 Coastal Plain League – official site

2015 establishments in North Carolina
Baseball venues in North Carolina
Multi-purpose stadiums in the United States
Soccer venues in North Carolina
Sports venues completed in 2015
Sports venues in Wake County, North Carolina